The following is a list of alumni of Queen Mary University of London.

Notable alumni

Academics
 Sir Gilbert Barling – British surgeon, Vice-Chancellor of the University of Birmingham
 Florence Mahoney – Gambian educator, academic, first woman to obtain a PhD from Gambia
 Sir William Turner – British anatomist, Principal of the University of Edinburgh, 1903-1916

Historians and philosophers
 Malcolm Bowie – British academic and literary critic
 Brycchan Carey – British historian and literary critic
 Eric Ives – British historian and an expert on the Tudor period
 Alasdair MacIntyre – British philosopher
 Marjorie Reeves – British historian
 Sir Roy Strong – British historian

Mathematicians and scientists
 Timothy Ball – Canadian physical geographer and climatologist
 Bill Ballantine – British-born New Zealand marine biologist
 Frederick Blackman – British botanist and plant physiologist
 Julie Denekamp - radiobiologist and director of the Gray Laboratory
 John Frederick Dewey – British geologist
 David Drewry – British glaciologist and geophysicist (Geography, 1969)
 Felix Eugen Fritsch – British biologist
 William Elford Leach – British zoologist and marine biologist
 Esther Odekunle - British neurobiologist and antibody engineer
 Eleanor Mary Reid – British paleobotanist
 George Rolleston – British medical doctor, zoologist and evolutionary biologist
 Francis Rose – British botanist, conservationist, nature writer
 G. Spencer-Brown – British mathematician

Chemists
 Sir Jack Drummond – biochemist and nutritionist
 Sir Edward Frankland – British chemist
 C. Robin Ganellin – British chemist (Chemistry, 1958)
 Julius Grant – forensic scientist and intelligence officer who exposed forgeries through chemical analysis
 Walter Thomas James Morgan – British biochemist
 Rowland Pettit – Australian-born American chemist
 Sir John Meurig Thomas – British physical chemist
 Frank Gibbs Torto – Ghanaian chemist
 John S. Fossey –  British chemist and professor at the University of Birmingham
 John S. Fossey - British chemist
 Sir Robert Watson – British chemist (PhD in atmospheric chemistry in 1973)

Physicists
 Alexander Bradshaw – British physicist
 Sir Philip Campbell – British physicist, editor-in-chief of the science journal Nature (MSc Astrophysics, 1974)
 Michael Duff – British physicist at Imperial College London (Physics, 1969)
 Geraint F. Lewis – British astrophysicist, professor of Astrophysics at the University of Sydney
 Sir Peter Mansfield – British Nobel Prize–winning physicist
 Helen Mason – British physicist
 George C. McVittie – British cosmologist
 Brendan Scaife – Irish engineer and physicist
 David Southwood – British space scientist, Senior Research Investigator at Imperial College London
Angela Speck - Astrophysicist and Professor at the University of Missouri
 Geoffrey Ernest Stedman – New Zealand physicist
 Charles Taylor – British physicist, lecturer and author
 Sir Tejinder Virdee – British physicist
 Rosemary Wyse – British astrophysicist

Artists
 Ashley Banjo – British choreographer
 John Leech – British caricaturist
 Siddharth Mallya – Indian actor and model
 Simon C. Page – British graphic designer

Writers
 Kia Abdullah – British writer
 Caroline Venetia Annis - British writer
 J. G. Ballard – British writer of Empire of the Sun and Crash
 Alia Bano – British playwright
 Stephen Barber – British writer
 Sir Malcolm Bradbury – British writer
 Robert Bridges – British poet and holder of the honour of poet laureate from 1913
 Marcus Chown – British science writer, journalist and broadcaster, cosmology consultant for New Scientist magazine
 Allan Cubitt - British playwright, screenwriter and director
 Richard Gordon – British screenwriter and writer
 Lee Harwood – British poet
 Ruth Prawer Jhabvala – British writer and Academy Award-winning screenwriter
 Clive Leo McNeir - British linguist, lexicographer and author of crime novels
 Derek Marlowe - British playwright and screenwriter (did not graduate)
 Eleanor Updale – British award-winning author
 Sarah Waters – British author of Tipping The Velvet
 Guy Walters – British author, historian and journalist

Musicians

 Bernard Butler – British musician, former guitarist of Suede
 Bruce Dickinson – British singer of Iron Maiden
 Pete Doherty – British musician, writer, actor, poet and artist
 Jay Sean – British singer
 Shakka – British singer
 Roger Taylor – British drummer of the band Queen
 Valanto Trifonos – Greek–Cypriot singer; winner of Greek Idol season 1

Businesspeople
 Sir Richard Broadbent – British businessman
 Sir Frank Chapman – British CEO of BG Group
 Piers Corbyn – British scientist, businessman
 Christopher Rawson Penfold – British businessman, founder of Penfolds, an Australian wine producer
 David Sullivan – British businessman, newspaper publisher, and football chairmen and investor

Technologists
 Samson Abramsky – British computer scientist
 Igor Aleksander – British artificial intelligence researcher
 Keith Clark – British computer scientist; Professor of Computer Science at Imperial College London
 Mary Coombs - British computer scientist, first female commercial computer programmer in the UK
 Ian Lewis – British computer scientist
 Tom Maibaum – Hungarian computer scientist

Engineers
 Kurt Berger – Finnish aviation engineer
 William Glanville – civil engineer
 George Hockham – British engineer; together with Nobel Prize winner Charles Kao, widely recognised a pioneer in the field of optical fibres (PhD Electronic Engineering, 1969)
Ashitey Trebi-Ollennu - Ghanaian robotics engineer at the National Aeronautics and Space Administration (NASA) and the chief engineer and technical group leader for the mobility and manipulation group at the Jet Propulsion Laboratory. He has been associated with various NASA Mars missions, notably the Mars rover and InSight projects.

Lawyers and judges
 Dame Laura Cox – British lawyer, English High Court judge
 Sir William Davis – British lawyer, English High Court judge
 Roy Goode – British lawyer and author
 Tracey McDermott - past chief executive of Britain's Financial Conduct Authority and financial service executive
 Basil Markesinis – British lawyer
 Barbara Mensah - British judge
 Jeremy Phillips – British lawyer
 Sir Christopher Pitchford – British lawyer, Lord Justice of Appeal
 Anand Ramlogan – Trinidad and Tobago lawyer, Attorney-General of Trinidad and Tobago
 K. Sripavan – Sri Lankan lawyer, judge, the 44th and current Chief Justice of Sri Lanka
 Roger Tan Kor Mee – Malaysian lawyer

Broadcasters and journalists
 Graham Chapman – British actor, member of comedy group Monty Python
 Fleur East – British singer and The X Factor contestant
 Katia Elizarova – Russian model and actress
 Romola Garai – British actress
 Julie Gardner – British television producer responsible for Doctor Who
 Sean Gilder – British actor
 Sarah Harrison, British journalist
 Ching He Huang – British television chef
 Jane Hill – British newsreader, BBC News
 Kasia Madera - British newsreader, BBC News
 Bill O'Reilly – American television host, author, historian, syndicated columnist and political commentator
 Claire Price – British actress
 Roger Tilling – British broadcaster and voice of University Challenge
 Prannoy Roy – Indian journalist
 Kate Williams – British broadcaster and historian
 Peter Wingfield – British actor
 Mehmet Aksoy (filmmaker) - British - Kurdish Film Director and Editor in Chief of Kurdish Question.

Doctors, psychiatrists and surgeons

 John Abernethy – British surgeon
 Joseph Adams – British surgeon and pathologist
 Edgar Adrian – British neuroscientist and physiologist, recipient of the 1932 Nobel Prize for Physiology.
 Sir Christopher Andrewes – British virologist
 George Augustus Auden – British Professor of public health
 John Badley – British surgeon
 Edward Bancroft – British physician and double agent in the American Revolution
 Gopal Baratham – Singaporean author and neurosurgeon
 Frederick Batten – British neurologist and pediatrician
 Thomas Barnardo – Irish philanthropist
 Hannah Billig – British medical doctor
 Sir William Blizard – British surgeon, co-founded England's first clinical medical school, The London Hospital Medical College
 George Bodington – British pulmonary specialist
 Henry Edmund Gaskin Boyle – British anaesthetist
 Alfred James Broomhall – British medical missionary
 George Busk – British surgeon, zoologist and palaeontologist
 Tim Crow – British psychiatrist
 Thomas Blizard Curling – British surgeon
 Sir Henry Hallett Dale – British pharmacologist and physiologist, shared the 1936 Nobel Prize in Physiology or Medicine
 John Langdon Down – British physician; first to describe Down syndrome, a genetic disorder named after him
 Colonel Sir Weary Dunlop – Australian surgeon
 John Freke – British ophthalmic surgeon
 Sir Archibald Garrod – British physician, first to appreciate the importance of biochemistry in medicine
 Major Greenwood – British epidemiologist and statistician
 Gordon Hamilton-Fairley – British oncologist
 William Harvey – British physician who made seminal contributions in anatomy and physiology, first person to describe circulation
 James Hinton – British surgeon and author
 Ebbe Hoff – American medical doctor and academic
 Allan Victor Hoffbrand – British medical doctor and academic
 John Hunter – British surgeon and anatomist; Hunterian Society is named in his honour
 Sir Jonathan Hutchinson – British surgeon, ophthalmologist, dermatologist, venereologist and pathologist
 John Hughlings Jackson – British neurologist
 William Lawrence – British surgeon, a founder of British ophthalmology
 Andrew Lees – British neurologist
 William John Little – British orthopedic surgeon, pioneer of orthopaedic surgery
 Morell Mackenzie – British physician, pioneer of laryngology
 William Marsden – British surgeon, founder of The Royal Free and Marsden Hospitals
 Sir James Paget – British surgeon and founder of scientific medical pathology
 Stephen Paget – British surgeon, the son of the distinguished surgeon and pathologist Sir James Paget, proposed the "seed and soil" theory of metastasis
 James Parkinson – British political activist and first to describe Parkinson's disease
 Jonathan Pereira – British pharmacologist
 Percivall Pott – British surgeon, one of the founders of orthopedics, and the first scientist to demonstrate that a cancer may be caused by an environmental carcinogen
 W. H. R. Rivers – British psychiatrist, psychiatric anthropologist
 Sir Ronald Ross – British medical doctor, received the Nobel Prize for Physiology or Medicine in 1902 for his work on the transmission of malaria
 Elizabeth Press – British immunologist
 Sir Peter Ratcliffe – British molecular biologist
 William Scovell Savory – British surgeon
 Sir Frederick Treves, 1st Baronet – British surgeon
 Daniel Hack Tuke – British expert on mental illness
 Sir James Underwood – British pathologist
 Karen Vousden – British medical researcher
 Hugh Watkins – British cardiologist
 William James Erasmus Wilson – British surgeon
 Donald Winnicott – British paediatrician and psychoanalyst

Medical missionaries

 Albert Ruskin Cook – British medical missionary
 Sir Wilfred Grenfell – British medical missionary
 John Preston Maxwell – British medical missionary
 Robert Morrison – British medical missionary
 Frederick Howard Taylor – British medical missionary
 Herbert Hudson Taylor – British medical missionary
 Hudson Taylor – British medical missionary

Politicians, civil servants and Parliamentarians

Politicians
 Christopher Addison, 1st Viscount Addison – British politician, Labour Party Member of Parliament
 Apsana Begum – First British hijabi Member of Parliament
 Sir Peter Caruana – Gibraltarian politician, Chief Minister of Gibraltar
 Lynda Chalker, Baroness Chalker of Wallasey – British politician, former Conservative Party Member of Parliament
 Mary Clancy - Canadian politician and lawyer, former Member of Parliament
 Sir William Job Collins – British politician and surgeon, Liberal Party Member of Parliament, Vice-Chancellor of the University of London
 David Currie, Baron Currie of Marylebone – British politician, member of the House of Lords
 John Cronin – British politician and surgeon, Labour Party Member of Parliament
 Marcia Matilda Falkender, Baroness Falkender – British politician, member of the House of Lords
 Sir Alan Glyn – British politician, Conservative Party Member of Parliament
 Donald McIntosh Johnson – British author and politician
 Peter Hain – British politician, Labour Party Member of Parliament, former Secretary of State for Work and Pensions and Secretary of State for Wales
 Stephen Hammond – British politician, Conservative Party Member of Parliament and former UK Government Minister
 Anthony Hamilton-Smith, 3rd Baron Colwyn – British politician
 Francis Hare, 6th Earl of Listowel – Irish British politician, member of the House of Lords
 Charles Hill, Baron Hill of Luton – British politician and former chairman of the BBC
 Guðni Th. Jóhannesson – Icelandic politician, historian and lecturer; President of Iceland (2016-) 
 Leo Chen-jan Lee – Taiwanese politician, Vice Minister of Foreign Affairs, Taiwan
 Esther McVey – British politician, Conservative Party Member of Parliament
 Joseph Ngute - Cameroonian politician, the 9th Prime Minister of Cameroon
 Stephanie Peacock – British Labour Party politician, the Member of Parliament for Barnsley East
 Tom Pursglove – British politician, Conservative Party Member of Parliament
 Bell Ribeiro-Addy – British Politician, Labour Party Member of Parliament for Streatham
 Janet Royall, Baroness Royall of Blaisdon – British politician, Leader of the House of Lords from October 2008 to May 2010
 Caroline Spelman – British politician, Conservative Party Member of Parliament and former Secretary of State for Environment, Food and Rural Affairs
 John Whittaker – British economics academic at Lancaster University; former politician, UKIP Member of the European Parliament
 Dato Amin Liew – Bruneian Cabinet Minister

Administrators and civil servants
 David Blanchflower – British-American economist
 Dame Colette Bowe – British civil servant
 William Carr – British-Australian admiral
 Simon Case – British civil servant
 Sir Curtis Keeble – British ambassador to the USSR
 Sir Michael Lyons – British chairman of the BBC Trust
 Davidson Nicol – Sierra Leonean academic and diplomat, Permanent Representative of Sierra Leone to the United Nations, High Commissioner to the United Kingdom and Under-Secretary-General of the United Nations
 Dame Veronica Sutherland – British ambassador, sixth President of Lucy Cavendish College, Cambridge, and former ambassador to the Republic of Ireland
 Martin Uden – British ambassador to South Korea
 Princess Laurentien of the Netherlands – Dutch royalty, Vice-President of Fauna & Flora International, Chair of the European Cultural Foundation

Clergy and religious leaders
 Joyce M. Bennett – British Anglican priest and member of the Anglican clergy (first Englishwoman to be ordained a priest in the Anglican Communion)
 Pamela Evans – British medical doctor and Christian writer
 Martyn Lloyd-Jones – British evangelical Christian religious leader

Sportspeople

 Richard Budgett – British gold medal-winning Olympic rower
 Martin Cross – British gold medal-winning Olympic rower
 W. G. Grace – British cricketer
 Mike Hennessy – British Olympic rower
 Jimmy Hill – British footballer, football manager, TV presenter
 William Hughes - Welsh boxer
 Martyna Snopek – Polish paralympic rower
 Arthur Wint – Jamaican athlete, won Jamaica's first gold medal at the 1948 London Olympics in the 400 metres, and a silver medal in the 800 metres

References 

 
Queen Mary